In 2006 the D1 Grand Prix championship, a drifting motor racing competition, comprised eight rounds held in Japan and the United States. The overall winner was Nobushige Kumakubo. There was also a D1 Street Legal competition run over seven rounds in Japan, and national competitions in Malaysia and the United Kingdom.

Changes for the 2006 season
 An extra 1 point is now awarded to the driver who manages to earn a perfect score of 100.0 during a 100pt tansou (solo run) round from the judges.
 Jyuri Tamashiro replaces Hatsuno Sugaya as a D1 Gal.
 The D1SL debuts as a full championship season.
 The two national series (D1GB, United Kingdom; and D1MY, Malaysia debuts as full-championship seasons).
 Introduction of four regional D1SL series in Japan, which awards the winners a D1 License.

2006 schedules
n.b. Winning Driver are mentioned on the right

2006 D1 Grand Prix Point Series
Round 1 - March 3/4 - Irwindale Speedway, Irwindale, California, United States - Yasuyuki Kazama (S15)
Round 2 - April 29/30 - Sports Land SUGO, Miyagi Prefecture, Japan - Ken Nomura (ER34)
Round 3 - May 13/14 - Fuji Speedway, Shizuoka Prefecture, Japan - Yasuyuki Kazama (S15)
Round 4 - July 29/30 - Autopolis, Ōita Prefecture, Japan - Ken Nomura (ER34)
Round 5 - August 26/27 - Ebisu South Course, Fukushima Prefecture, Japan - Nobushige Kumakubo (GDB)
Round 6 - September 9/10 - Suzuka Circuit, Mie Prefecture, Japan - Hideo Hiraoka (S15)
Round 7 - October 21/22 - Fuji Speedway, Shizuoka Prefecture, Japan - Masato Kawabata (S15)
Round 8 - December 15/16 - Irwindale Speedway, Irwindale, California, United States - Kazuhiro Tanaka (GDB)

2006 D1 Street Legal Series
Round 1 - February 4/5 - Sekia Hills, Kumamoto Prefecture, Japan - Masao Suenaga (FD3S)
Round 2 - April 15/16 - Ebisu South Course, Fukushima Prefecture, Japan - Masao Suenaga (FD3S)
Round 3 - April 29/30 - Sports Land Sugo, Miyagi Prefecture, Japan (D1GP Week) - Toru Inose (S15)
Round 4 - May 13/14 - Fuji Speedway, Shizuoka Prefecture, Japan (D1GP Week) - Hiroyuki Fukushima (PS13)
Round 5 - July 29/30 - Autopolis, Ōita Prefecture, Japan (D1GP Week) - Kazuyoshi Okamura (S15)
Round 6 - August 26/27 - Ebisu, Fukushima Prefecture, Japan (D1GP Week) - Yoshinori Koguchi  (JZX100)
Round 7 - November 11/12 - Sekia Hills, Kumamoto Prefecture, Japan - Tetsuya Hibino (S14)

Exhibition Rounds
Exhibition RD-1 June 17/18 - Silverstone, Silverstone, Northamptonshire, UK - Yasuyuki Kazama (S15)
Exhibition RD-2 July 14/15 - Las Vegas Motor Speedway, Las Vegas, Nevada, United States - Toshiki Yoshioka (AE85)
World All-Star December 17 - Irwindale Speedway, Irwindale, California, United States - Ken Nomura (ER34)

Domestic National Series

UK Series
Round 1–28 May - Rockingham Motor Speedway, Northamptonshire - Brett Castle (S14)
Round 2–17 June  - Silverstone, Silverstone, Northamptonshire,  - Phil Morrison (S14)
Round 3–2 July - Knockhill, Dunfermline, Fife, Scotland - Damien Mulvey (PS13)
Round 4–20 August - Silverstone, Silverstone, Northamptonshire - Mark Luney (BNR32)
Round 5–3 September - Silverstone, Silverstone, Northamptonshire - Ben Broke Smith (HCR32)

Malaysia Series
Round 1–11 March - Go-Kart track, Shah Alam, Selangor - Zero Lim Kim Ling (A31)
Round 2–22 April - Danga Bay, Johor Bahru - Tengku Djan Ley (AE86)
Round 3–1 July - car park, Shah Alam, Selangor - Tengku Djan Ley (AE86)
Round 4–12 August - Batu Kawan Stadium car park, Batu Kawan, Penang - Tengku Djan Ley (AE86)
Round 5–28 October - Shah Alam, Selangor - Tengku Djan Ley (AE86)

New Zealand Driver search
Round 1–28 May - Pukekohe Park Raceway, New Zealand - Sean Falconer, Dayna Jury, Jarius Wharerau, Darren McDonald
Round 2–16 September - Powerbuilt Raceway at Ruapuna Park, New Zealand - Adam Richards, Glen Pupich, Phil Taylor, Kahu Campbell

Championship Results
Round 1

Round 2

Round 3

Round 4

Round 5

Round 6

Round 7

Round 8

Final Championship Results

D1GP

 Highlighted in blue - 100pt tansou (solo run) bonus
Source: D1GP Official Site 2006 Championship table

D1SL

 Highlighted in blue - 100pt tansou (solo run) bonus
Source: D1GP Official Site 2006 Championship table

D1GB

D1MY

See also
 D1 Grand Prix
 Drifting (motorsport)

Sources
D1GP Results Database 2006

D1 Grand Prix seasons
D1 Grand Prix
2006 in Japanese motorsport